Michel Thiollière (born 10 April 1955 in Saint-Étienne, Loire) is a French politician, senator for the Loire since 2001.   He was the Mayor of Saint-Étienne from 1994 to 2008. He is a member of the Radical Party.

In 2006, he was one of the finalists for World Mayor.

External links
World Mayor profile

1955 births
Living people
Mayors of Saint-Étienne
Radical Party (France) politicians
French Senators of the Fifth Republic
Senators of Loire (department)